The 1953 Tampa Spartans football team represented the University of Tampa in the 1953 college football season. It was the Spartans' 17th season. The team was led by head coach Marcelino Huerta, in his second year, and played their home games at Phillips Field in Tampa, Florida. They finished with a record of six wins and six losses (6–6).

Schedule

References

Tampa
Tampa Spartans football seasons
Tampa Spartans football